The Civil Administration of the Mountain, sometimes referred to as Jabal al-Druze, named after the Druze region in Syria, was a Druze-dominated geopolitical region that existed in Lebanon from 1983 until its gradual erosion following the Taif Agreement and the end of the country's civil war. It was one of the wartime state-like territories (known as cantons) which was controlled by the People's Liberation Army (PLA). The PLA controlled most of the Chouf district and some parts of Aley and Baabda. It bordered the East Beirut canton to the north, which was controlled by a rival Christian militia, the Lebanese Forces.

Voice of the Mountain 
Although its beginning was in 1983, the broadcasting of the Voice of the Mountain officially began operations on 1 February 1984. It operated from the Chouf Mountains. Ghazi Aridi worked as the director of the station until 1994 when it was closed.

References 

States and territories established in 1983
States and territories disestablished in 1983
Deep states of the Lebanese Civil War
Progressive Socialist Party
Lebanese Civil War